Patmos is an unincorporated community in Mahoning County, in the U.S. state of Ohio.

History
Patmos had its start when John Templin opened a store there in 1850. The community was named after the hymn "Patmos". A post office called Patmos was established in 1851, and remained in operation until 1901.

References

Unincorporated communities in Mahoning County, Ohio
1850 establishments in Ohio
Populated places established in 1850
Unincorporated communities in Ohio